Hugh Riddle (1822–1892) was an American railroad executive.

Early in his career he worked for the Erie Railroad, the Buffalo and State Line Railroad, and the Canandaigua and Niagara Falls Railroad. He served as General Superintendent of the Erie Railroad from January 1, 1864 to May 1, 1869 as successor of Charles Minot.

In 1869 he was appointed Superintendent of the Chicago, Rock Island and Pacific Railroad, became Vice-President in 1871, and served as President from 1877 to 1883.

See also
 List of railroad executives

References

1822 births
1892 deaths
19th-century American railroad executives
Erie Railroad
Chicago, Rock Island and Pacific Railroad